Cathryn Lorraine Fitzpatrick (born 4 March 1968) is an Australian former cricketer. She was recognised as the world's fastest female bowler throughout her career and became the first woman to take 100 One Day International wickets. She appeared in 13 Test matches, 109 One Day Internationals and two Twenty20 Internationals for Australia between 1991 and 2007. She played domestic cricket for Victoria. In 2019, Fitzpatrick was inducted into both the Australian Cricket Hall of Fame and the ICC Cricket Hall of Fame.

Career summary
While juggling her full-time job as a waste collector and later a postwoman, Fitzpatrick represented Australia in cricket on 124 occasions. She made her international debut in 1991 and went on to play 13 Test matches, taking 60 wickets (the second-most by an Australian woman, only behind Betty Wilson) at an average of 19.11.

Fitzpatrick also played 109 One Day Internationals, taking 180 wickets (the most by any woman until surpassed by Jhulan Goswami in May 2017) at an average of 16.79. She was a member of the Australian team that won the Women's Cricket World Cup in 1997 and 2005.

On 25 February 2006, Fitzpatrick became the oldest woman to take a five-wicket haul in ODI history, at the age of 37 years and 358 days. In March 2007, she announced her retirement from international cricket and also brought her domestic career with Victoria to an end after taking 148 wickets in 103 WNCL matches.

From May 2012 to March 2015, Fitzpatrick served as head coach of the Australian women's team, overseeing three successful world championship campaigns.

In 2019, Fitzpatrick was inducted into the Australian Cricket Hall of Fame. Later that year, she was inducted into the ICC Cricket Hall of Fame.

Bowling speed 
Due to limitations of available technological resources in her playing tenure, Fitzpatrick's top and average speeds are estimates rather than precise figures. Thorough eye-witness testimony agrees she was the world's fastest female bowler during her prime years, while sporadic measurements indicated her quickest delivery was at least 125 km/h. This evaluation holds up both impressively and credibly compared to modern women's cricket which is characterised by its increased professional standards—as of 2019, the fastest current bowlers are South Africa's Shabnim Ismail and New Zealand's Lea Tahuhu, who have been officially recorded at speeds of 128 km/h and 126 km/h respectively.

Honours

Team 
2x Women's Cricket World Cup champion: 1997, 2005
2x Women's National Cricket League champion: 2002–03, 2004–05

Individual 
Belinda Clark Award winner: 2004

References

Notes

Further reading

External links
 
 
 World's fastest bowler retires, Fox Sports, 27 March 2007
 Fitzpatrick retires after 16-year career, Cricinfo, 27 March 2007
 Cathryn Fitzpatrick at southernstars.org.au

1968 births
Australia women One Day International cricketers
Australia women Test cricketers
Australia women Twenty20 International cricketers
Australian cricket coaches
Living people
Cricketers from Melbourne
Victoria women cricketers
Australian Cricket Hall of Fame inductees
Female cricket coaches